Pavel Shmigero (born 3 January 1982) is a Belarusian football coach and former player. He currently works as a youth coach at BATE Borisov. He was a member of Belarusian squad at 2004 UEFA European Under-21 Championship.

Career

Coaching career
In February 2016, Shmigero returned to BATE Borisov as a youth coach. Two years later, he also joined the coaching staff of Torpedo Minsk. As of June 2019, he was still working as a youth coach for BATE Borisov.

Honours
BATE Borisov
 Belarusian Premier League champion: 2002
 Belarusian Cup winner: 2005–06

References

External links
 Player profile at BATE website
 

1982 births
Living people
Belarusian footballers
Association football midfielders
Belarusian Premier League players
FC Lida players
FC Torpedo Minsk players
FC BATE Borisov players
FC Shakhtyor Soligorsk players
FC Belshina Bobruisk players
FC Granit Mikashevichi players
FC SKVICH Minsk players
FC Smorgon players
People from Lida
Sportspeople from Grodno Region